Bentleya is a genus of flowering plants belonging to the family Pittosporaceae.

Its native range is Western Australia.

Species:

Bentleya spinescens

References

Pittosporaceae
Apiales genera